William S. Hiatt (born c.1936) was an American politician.

While serving in the North Carolina House of Representatives, Hiatt resided in Mount Airy. In 1974, he proposed bills that would have limited sales of beer on Sundays, and near schools or churches. He contested the Republican Party nomination for the 1976 North Carolina lieutenant gubernatorial election, losing the office of lieutenant governor to James C. Green. He ran for the office a second time in 1984; the GOP named John H. Carrington its nominee.

References

Year of birth uncertain
Living people
20th-century American politicians
21st-century American politicians
People from Mount Airy, North Carolina
Republican Party members of the North Carolina House of Representatives
Year of birth missing (living people)